Baldwin Park is a city located in the central San Gabriel Valley region of Los Angeles County, California, United States. As of the 2020 census, the population was 72,176, down from 75,390 at the 2010 census.

History 
Baldwin Park  began as part of cattle grazing land belonging to the San Gabriel Mission. It eventually became part of the Rancho Azusa de Dalton and the Rancho La Puente properties. The community became known as Vineland in 1860. By 1906 it changed to Baldwin Park. It was named after Elias J. "Lucky" Baldwin. In 1956 Baldwin Park became the 47th incorporated city in the State of California. Currently the city is pushing to revitalize its economic base. There are six active Project Redevelopment Areas located in strategic areas of the city.

Projects within these redevelopment areas are as diverse, including high-quality senior housing, Home Depot, Starbucks, Harley Davidson, a transit oriented district (TOD) near the Metrolink Train Station and various other thriving businesses.

Baldwin Park is home to the first In-N-Out burger stand, opened on October 22, 1948. It was the first drive-thru in California and was replaced in November 2004 with a new building. The new In-N-Out University and company store opened in 2006 on Francisquito Avenue. Also, the company's first meatpacking plant is located down the street from the locations at the company headquarters on Hamburger Lane. In-N-Out now has a second meat processing plant in Texas to serve their Texas restaurants.

As of September 1882, the first school house was built on the southeast corner of North Maine and Los Angeles Avenues in 1884. It contained two rows of double seats, a central aisle leading to the teacher's desk, and a heating stove at the north end. Mr. Frazier was the first teacher. In April 1888, the Vineland School District was established according to county records.

The first Board of Trustees took office on July 1, 1888, and elected Miss Jessie Washburn to teach the district school that fall. The building was sold in 1890 and moved to another site for a private residence. The district built the second school in 1890 and hired two teachers, Miss Ellen Lang and Miss Venna O. Finney. The second school house was relegated to the past in 1912. It later became a private Japanese school and stood as a landmark until it caught fire on September 5, 1936, and burned to the ground. Today, the Baldwin Park Unified School District lies contiguously with the city's borders. There are 23 schools within this district. The budget is well over $100 million. Currently the district is building new school structures to accommodate growth. The district is adopting data driven strategies to help students achieve better scores in the API tests. There is an active push by the district to hire new teachers while providing retirement incentives for teachers who wish to retire.

In the 1950s Vias Turkey Ranch was about one mile (1.6 km) from the now 10 Freeway just off of Frazier Avenue. This huge commercial turkey ranch was famous in the Valley for a huge outdoor aviary with a unique selection of birds. The ranch had two or three types of deer species. When the value of the land escalated, the property was sold and the Ranch moved to Apple Valley.

The McMullan Dairy was on Frazier where area schools brought students on field trips.

Popular pastimes in the 1950s included riding at the horse stables across the bridge of the San Gabriel River, which was an open sand and rock river bed, and ride one hour for the sum of $1.00, a hefty price at that time considering that the minimum wage was fifty cents an hour.

In summer 2005, Save Our State, an anti-illegal immigration group based in Ventura, launched a series of protests against the Danzas Indigenas, art at the Baldwin Park Metrolink station designed for the MTA in 1993 by artist Judy Baca. The monument bears several engraved statements whose origins are not attributed. At issue was one particular inscription--It was better before they came—that Save Our State claimed was directed against Anglo whites. In fact, according to Baca, that sentence was uttered by an Anglo white Baldwin Park resident in the 1950s; he was lamenting the influx of persons of Mexican ancestry into the San Gabriel Valley following World War II. Save Our State continued the protests, which drew counter-protesters and required city expenditure on crowd control and riot police. Save Our State stopped protesting towards the end of the summer and has not made any further appearances in the city.

Geography 
According to the United States Census Bureau, the city has a total area of 17.6 km (6.8 mi). 17.2 km (6.6 mi) of it is land and 0.4 km (0.2 mi) of it (2.28%) is water.

Climate 
Baldwin Park experiences a mild winter and warm to hot summer.

Demographics

2010
At the 2010 census Baldwin Park had a population of 75,390. The racial makeup of Baldwin Park was 33,119 (43.9%) White, (4.3% Non-Hispanic White), 913 (1.2%) African American, 674 (0.9%) Native American, 10,696 (14.2%) Asian, 85 (0.1%) Pacific Islander, 27,079 (35.9%) from other races, and 2,824 (3.7%) from two or more races. Hispanic or Latino of any race were 60,403 persons (80.1%).

The census reported that 74,984 people (99.5% of the population) lived in households, 88 (0.1%) lived in non-institutionalized group quarters, and 318 (0.4%) were institutionalized.

There were 17,189 households, 10,027 (58.3%) had children under the age of 18 living in them, 10,097 (58.7%) were opposite-sex married couples living together, 3,358 (19.5%) had a female householder with no husband present, 1,700 (9.9%) had a male householder with no wife present.  There were 1,093 (6.4%) unmarried opposite-sex partnerships, and 103 (0.6%) same-sex married couples or partnerships. 1,474 households (8.6%) were one person and 648 (3.8%) had someone living alone who was 65 or older. The average household size was 4.36.  There were 15,155 families (88.2% of households); the average family size was 4.45.

The age distribution was 22,571 people (29.9%) under the age of 18, 8,849 people (11.7%) aged 18 to 24, 21,588 people (28.6%) aged 25 to 44, 16,323 people (21.7%) aged 45 to 64, and 6,059 people (8.0%) who were 65 or older.  The median age was 30.5 years. For every 100 females, there were 98.5 males.  For every 100 females age 18 and over, there were 96.0 males.

There were 17,736 housing units at an average density of 2,613.8 per square mile, of the occupied units 10,353 (60.2%) were owner-occupied and 6,836 (39.8%) were rented. The homeowner vacancy rate was 1.3%; the rental vacancy rate was 3.3%.  45,844 people (60.8% of the population) lived in owner-occupied housing units and 29,140 people (38.7%) lived in rental housing units.

According to the 2010 United States Census, Baldwin Park had a median household income of $51,153, with 17.5% of the population living below the federal poverty line.

2000
At the 2000 census there were 75,837 people in 16,961 households, including 15,061 families, in the city.  The population density was 4,396.5/km (11,379.2/mi).  There were 17,430 housing units at an average density of 1,010.5/km (2,615.3/mi).  The racial makeup of the city was 40.18% White, 1.61% Black or African American, 1.45% Native American, 11.64% Asian, 0.15% Pacific Islander, 40.51% from other races, and 4.48% from two or more races. 78.67% of the population were Hispanic or Latino of any race.
Of the 16,961 households, 55.9% had children under the age of 18 living with them, 62.8% were married couples living together, 17.5% had a female householder with no husband present, and 11.2% were non-families. 8.1% of households were one person, and 3.9% were one person aged 65 or older. The average household size was 4.44 and the average family size was 4.53.

The age distribution was 34.9% under the age of 18, 11.9% from 18 to 24, 30.6% from 25 to 44, 16.4% from 45 to 64, and 6.2% 65 or older.  The median age was 27 years. For every 100 females, there were 100.0 males. For every 100 females age 18 and over, there were 97.3 males.

The median household income was $41,629 and the median family income  was $41,256. Males had a median income of $26,873 versus $22,186 for females. The per capita income for the city was $11,562.  About 15.4% of families and 18.2% of the population were below the poverty line, including 21.8% of those under age 18 and 12.8% of those age 65 or over.

Economy

Top employers
According to the city's 2014 Comprehensive Annual Financial Report, the top employers in the city are:

Government

On the Los Angeles County Board of Supervisors, Baldwin Park is represented by 1st District Supervisor Hilda Solis.

The Los Angeles County Department of Health Services operates the Monrovia Health Center in Monrovia, serving Baldwin Park.

Baldwin Park has a city police department of its own, but contracts for fire and rescue with the Los Angeles County Fire Department.

Notable people
 Sutan Amrull (born 1974), make-up artist, drag performer
 Bernardo Flores (born 1995), pitcher for Diablos Rojos del México of the Mexican League
 Darren Hall (born 2000), cornerback for the Atlanta Falcons
 Mike Munoz (born 1965), former pitcher for Detroit Tigers and Colorado Rockies

References

External links
 
 Baldwin Park Unified School District website
 Danzas Indigenas info and photos

 
Communities in the San Gabriel Valley
Cities in Los Angeles County, California
Populated places established in 1880
Incorporated cities and towns in California
1880 establishments in California